Sant'Angelo Lomellina is a comune (municipality) in the Province of Pavia in the Italian region Lombardy, located about 45 km southwest of Milan and about 35 km west of Pavia. As of 31 December 2004, it had a population of 821 and an area of 10.4 km².

Sant'Angelo Lomellina borders the following municipalities: Castello d'Agogna, Castelnovetto, Ceretto Lomellina, Cozzo, Zeme.

Demographic evolution

References

Cities and towns in Lombardy